Kristallen (meaning The Crystal) is the official Swedish television award, administered by the foundation  . It was created in 2005 by television producers SVT, TV3, TV4, Kanal 5 and UR.

The trophy 
The award trophy, created by Mårten Claesson, Eero Koivisto and Ola Rune, is made out of crystal glass, a material with a long tradition in Swedish art.

Award categories
Kristallen is awarded in a number of categories, including the following:

Juried awards
 Entertainment show of the year
 Series of the year
 Drama of the year
 Humour programme of the year
 Children's and teenager's programme of the year
 Current events programme of the year
 Documentary of the year
 Reality show of the year

Awards by popular vote
 Male host of the year
 Female host of the year
 Sports presenter of the year
 Show of the year

Special award
 The recipient of the special award is chosen by the  board.

2010 winners 
The Kristallen prizes for 2010 were awarded on 3 September 2010.

Juried awards

Public vote

Special award

2011 winners 
The Kristallen prizes for 2011 were awarded on 9 September 2010.

Juried awards

Public vote

Special award

2021
In 2021, the awards were presented on 27 August. The Thin Blue Line  won "Best TV Drama and Best Programme of the year" at the annual Swedish television awards, the Kristallen TV Awards.

References

External links 
 

 
Swedish television awards
2005 establishments in Sweden
Awards established in 2005